Tom Canning (born 1948) is an American keyboardist, writer, producer, and arranger.

He is perhaps best known for his long-time collaborations with the renowned Jazz/R&B singer Al Jarreau. He has also performed and/or recorded with a wide variety of artists including Eric Clapton, Bonnie Raitt, Wayne Shorter, Glenn Frey, Joe Walsh, T-Bone Burnett, Freddie King, Johnny Shines, Rickie Lee Jones, Elvis Costello, Albert Lee, Playing for Change, Carlene Carter, Johnny Paycheck, Ray Lynch and Johnny Hallyday. Canning has been a part of John Mayall's Bluesbreakers for over a decade, appearing on most of Mayall's releases from 1993's Wake Up Call up to 2009's Tough.

Early life 

Tom Canning was born and raised in Rochester, New York. His father, Thomas Canning, was a professor of Music Theory and Composition at the Eastman School of Music, and his mother was a professional church vocalist. After studying at Berklee School of Music in Boston and North Texas State University, Canning eventually settled in Los Angeles. Soon after arriving in L.A., he began performing and recording with artists such as Delbert McClinton, John Klemmer and T-Bone Burnett.

Career

Al Jarreau 
In 1974, Canning met the then-unsigned Al Jarreau. They began working together as a duo at The Bla-Bla Cafe, a nightclub in Studio City, CA. Shortly thereafter, Jarreau signed an extended contract with Warner Brothers Records. Canning then worked as Jarreau's Musical Director and eventually his co-writer and co-producer. International touring and recording led to seven albums, multi-platinum sales and numerous Grammy awards. Some of Jarreau’s more well-known songs that Canning co-wrote are “Thinkin’ About It Too”, “Never Givin’ Up”, ”Roof Garden”, “Breakin’ Away”, “Step By Step”, “Black and Blues” and “Lost and Found”.

T-Bone Burnett 
In 1972 Canning began recording with T-Bone Burnett on The B-52 Band & the Fabulous Skylarks. He subsequently played on several of Burnett’s solo albums, including those with The Alpha Band. Canning later composed or played on several films for which Burnett produced the music, including Divine Secrets of the Ya-Ya Sisterhood, the Oscar winners Walk the Line and Crazy Heart, and The Ballad of Buster Scruggs.

Thicke of the Night 
In 1983, Canning was the original musical director for the television variety/talk show Thicke of the Night. The show’s house band included Alan Pasqua, Kevin Dukes, Dennis Belfield, Mike Baird and Gary Herbig. Richard Belzer, Gilbert Gottfried, Arsenio Hall, and Charles Fleischer were among the cast of writers and performers.

Johnny Hallyday 
In 1998, Canning began performing with French singer Johnny Hallyday. From 1998 through 2003, Canning toured with Hallyday through France and Canada, released three live CD/DVDs (Stade de France 98: Johnny allume le feu, 100% Johnny: Live à la tour Eiffel, and Un soir à l Olympia). Band members included Brian Ray, Abe Laboriel Jr., Curt Bisquera, Reggie Hamilton, and Harry Kim. Canning later returned to France in 2007 with singer Eddy Mitchell, touring and recording the CD Jambalaya, and the live CD/DVD Jambalaya Live. The band included guitarist Todd Sharp, and Davey Faragher and Pete Thomas.

John Mayall 
Tom toured and recorded with British blues artist John Mayall, appearing on a total of 10 albums, including the John Mayall 70th Birthday Concert CD/DVD, featuring Eric Clapton and Mick Taylor.

Film and television 
Canning has composed and performed for a variety of shows including Melrose Place (Fox), The Larry Sanders Show (HBO), Memphis Beat (TNT), Cinema Verite (HBO), Magic City (STARZ) and Psych (USA).

His composition, “The Oh of Pleasure”, co-written with New Age artist Ray Lynch, has been licensed many times for a wide variety of film, television and commercial outlets.

Works

Discography 

 

†Released as DVD

*As “K.O. Thomas”

Filmography

References

External links 
 

Living people
1948 births
20th-century American keyboardists
21st-century American keyboardists
20th-century American writers
21st-century American writers